a Japanese shōjo manga author and artist. She is a former member of CLAMP, having left the group on October 1, 1992.

Akiyama has also done illustrations for three novels (Kyokutō Shōnen and Komaranu mae no kami da nomi by Kobayashi Megumi and Watashi no Kare wa Hamster by Edō Kei) and illustrations for a CD (Psycho Sound Machine Drama by Ohara Mariko).

Works

Hyper Rune, Mouryou Kiden, Secret Chaser, and Zyword are currently being published in North America by Tokyopop. In CLAMP’s early years, Akiyama worked on doujinshi in the BL genre. Her collaborative doujinshi works have been released on July 19, 1988, in a collection known as CLAMP Book.

See also
 CLAMP

References

External links
paupau*BOX - Tamayo Akiyama's Official Site

 
Living people
People from Osaka
Clamp (manga artists)
1966 births